Hub is an unincorporated community in Kings and Fresno Counties, California.

References

Unincorporated communities in California
Unincorporated communities in Kings County, California
Unincorporated communities in Fresno County, California